The 31st District of the Iowa Senate is located in northeast Iowa, and is currently composed of Black Hawk County.

Current elected officials
William Dotzler is the senator currently representing the 31st District.

The area of the 31st District contains two Iowa House of Representatives districts:
The 61st District (represented by Timi Brown-Powers)
The 62nd District (represented by Ras Smith)

The district is also located in Iowa's 1st congressional district, which is represented by Ashley Hinson.

Past senators
The district has previously been represented by:

Lowell Junkins, 1983–1985
Gene Fraise, 1986–1992
Ralph Rosenberg, 1993–1994
Johnie Hammond, 1995–2002
Matt McCoy, 2003–2012
William Dotzler, 2013–present

See also
Iowa General Assembly
Iowa Senate

References

31